Mariam Ibrahim Metwally, (born November 11, 1996) is an Egyptian professional squash player. She reached a career high world ranking of World No. 20 in April 2018.

References

External links 

Egyptian female squash players
Living people
1996 births
21st-century Egyptian women